David Austin Howard (May 1, 1889 – January 26, 1956) nicknamed "Del", was a professional baseball player. He played two seasons in Major League Baseball in 1912 and 1915, primarily as a second baseman. He graduated from Cornell University in 1911 and was elected for membership in the Sphinx Head Society.

Sources

Major League Baseball second basemen
Washington Senators (1901–1960) players
Brooklyn Tip-Tops players
Atlanta Crackers players
Fall River Adopted Sons players
Fall River Spindles players
Haverhill Hustlers players
Lawrence Barristers players
Cornell Big Red baseball players
Baseball players from Washington, D.C.
1889 births
1956 deaths